Nahran (also Romanized as Nahrān; also known as Nahran-e Kharāb and Nahrān Kharāb) is a village in Hegmataneh Rural District, in the Central District of Hamadan County, Hamadan Province, Iran. At the 2006 census, its population was 164, in 38 families.

References 

Populated places in Hamadan County